Robyn Luff (born June 3, 1980) is an Alberta politician who was elected in the 2015 Alberta general election to the Legislative Assembly of Alberta representing the electoral district of Calgary-East as a member of the Alberta NDP caucus.  She sat as an independent from November 2018 to March 2019, when the legislature was dissolved for that year's general election.

Luff pulled off one of the biggest upsets on election night, as she defeated long time MLA Moe Amery to win the riding of Calgary-East.

On November 5, 2018, Luff made a statement announcing her refusal to sit in the Alberta legislature until changes were made to what she described as a "toxic culture" within the Alberta NDP caucus that prevented MLAs from expressing their views and properly representing their constituents. The government denied the allegations and removed Luff from its caucus later that evening, stating that it had "lost confidence in her ability to participate as a productive and trustworthy member of the government caucus".

Electoral record

References

1980 births
Alberta New Democratic Party MLAs
Living people
People from Duncan, British Columbia
Politicians from Calgary
Women MLAs in Alberta
21st-century Canadian politicians
21st-century Canadian women politicians
Politicians affected by a party expulsion process